HWY 62 is an album by American singer-songwriter Peter Case, released in 2015.

Critical reception

Writing for Allmusic, music critic Mark Deming wrote of the album "HWY 62 finds Peter Case rockin' the blues a little bit and singing with serious heart, soul, and wisdom all the time, and nearly three decades into his solo career he remains one of our best and most compelling singer/songwriters, with this album as proof." Steve Horowitz of PopMatters commented, "At its core, HWY 62 declares allegiance to the victims of unfairness, inequality, and the wrong things that happen to people, and announces that Case is one of them. That he can touch us so strongly with these tales reveals Case’s considerable artistic talents."

Track listing
All songs written by Peter Case unless otherwise noted.
"Pelican Bay" – 3:56	
"Waiting on a Plane" – 4:24	
"New Mexico" – 3:52	
"Water From a Stone" – 4:29	
"All Dressed Up (For Trial)" – 3:33	
"If I Go Crazy" – 5:06	
"The Long Good Time" – 4:09	
"Evicted" – 3:58	
"Long Time Gone" (Bob Dylan) – 4:30	
"Bluebells" – 3:30	
"HWY 62" – 1:05

Personnel
Peter Case – vocals, guitar, harmonica, piano
D. J. Bonebrake – drums, percussion
Ben Harper – guitar, slide guitar
Don Heffington – drums (snare)
Jebin Bruni – keyboards
David Carpenter – bass
Cindy Wasserman – harmony

Production notes:
Peter Case – producer
Sheldon Gomberg – producer, engineer, mixing
Larry Fergusson – engineer
Jason Gossman – engineer
Bill Mims – engineer
Gavin Lurssen – mastering
Reuben Cohen – mastering
David Ensminger – photography
Greg Allen – art direction, design
Mark Linett – tape Transfer

References

2015 albums
Peter Case albums
Omnivore Recordings albums